Andreas (or Andrew) was the Archbishop of Bari from 1062 to at least 1066, and probably somewhat longer. In 1066, he travelled to Constantinople where at some point he converted to Judaism. He then fled to the Muslim-dominated Egypt and remained there until his death in 1078.

Life

Andreas is attested in the ecclesiastical records of the Archbishopric of Bari, but very cursorily: Anonymi Barensis Chronicon, early-12th-century Bariot chronicle covering the years 855–1118, only mentions his elevation to archbishop in 1062, journey to Constantinople in 1066, and passing away in 1078.

However, Obadiah the Proselyte, another convert to Judaism and émigré to Egypt of about a generation later, was moved and inspired by Andreas's story, and recorded it in his memoirs. This autobiography, popularly known as "Obadiah Scroll", was preserved in the Cairo Geniza, a collection of some 350,000 documents that accumulated in the Ben Ezra Synagogue in Old Cairo, Egypt, from the 9th to 19th centuries, and since dispersed among libraries and collections around the world. In the course of the 20th century, fourteen fragments of the Scroll, now in Budapest, Cambridge and New York, were identified. The fragments in the Kaufmann Genizah Collection, Library of the Hungarian Academy of Sciences, Budapest, were discovered by the director of the Rabbinical Seminary Alexander Scheiber who published them in 1954. In one of the fragments, Obadiah tells the story that was widely discussed when he was still Johannes, young son of minor nobility, living with his parents in the small Italian town of Oppido Lucano:

In the Middle Ages, for the Catholic clergy to convert to Judaism was virtually unheard of, and only two high-profile cases are known:
 From the Annals of St. Bertin we learn that in 838 Frankish deacon Bodo converted to Judaism, fled the Aachen court of Louis the Pious, and settled in Muslim Spain. While there, he engaged in a theological debate with Álvaro of Córdoba, Jewish convert to Christianity (some of the letters they exchanged still survive).
 In De diversitate temporum, Benedictine chronicler Alpert of Metz records the story of Wecelinus, a cleric in the service of Conrad I, Duke of Carinthia, relative of the Holy Roman Emperor Henry II. In the year 1005 or 1006, Wecelinus converted, went to live with the Jews of Mainz, and even publicly polemicized against Christianity; one short tract, preserved by Alpert, enraged the Emperor enough to appoint his own court cleric to refute it. Notably, only a few years later, in 1012, Henry II expelled all the Jews from the city of Mainz, albeit for a short time.

Notes

References
 
 Cesare Colafemmina (2005) "La conversione al giudaismo di Andrea, arcivescovo di Bari: una suggestione per Giovanni-Ovadiah da Oppido" in Giovanni-Ovadiah da Oppido, proselito, viaggiatore e musicista dell'età normanna.
 Joshua Holo (2005) "Jewish communities and personalities within Ovadiah's chronicle", in Giovanni-Ovadiah da Oppido, proselito, viaggiatore e musicista dell'età normanna
  google books preview
 Norman Golb (1987) Jewish Proselytism — A Phenomenon in the Religious History of Early Medieval Europe, 10th annual Rabbi Louis Feinberg memorial lecture in Judaic Studies, University of Cincinnati.
 Norman Golb (2004) The Autograph Memoirs Of Obadiah The Proselyte Of Oppido Lucano, and The Epistle Of Barukh B. Isaac Of Aleppo
 
  online
Alessandro Pratesi (1961). "Andrea". Dizionario Biografico degli Italiani, Vol. 3. Rome: Istituto della Enciclopedia Italiana.
 
 
 
 

Archbishops of Bari
Converts to Judaism from Roman Catholicism
11th-century births
11th-century converts to Judaism
1078 deaths
Egyptian Jews
Italian Jews
Jews from the Fatimid Caliphate